Spring Tigers is the debut Mini-LP by Spring Tigers, released October 19, 2009 under exclusive US License to Bright Antenna. The album was made available as a Digital Download, CD and Limited Edition 10" Record.

Track listing

Car Song - 2:16
Hyboria - 3:02
Just Suggesting - 3:22
Beep Beep - 2:51
New Improved Formula - 2:01
Stripmalls In The Sun - 4:05

Personnel

Spring Tigers

Drums - Chase Prince
Keys - Stephen James
Bass - Eli Barnard
Guitar - Shane Davis
Vocals/Guitar - Kris Barratt

Technical Personnel

Engineered by Joel Hatstat at The Bakery
Produced by Sep V
Mixed by Mark Needham
Mastered by Andy VanDette at Masterdisk NYC
A&R by Braden Merrick

References

2009 EPs